Melvin Richins Brown (born February 15, 1938) is a Republican member of the Utah State House of Representatives who lives in Coalville, Utah, and represents House District 53.

Early life and career
Brown was born on February 15, 1938, in Henefer, Utah. His parents are Esther Richins and Leonard Brown. He along with Eddie Jensen were the first North Summit Braves to make football First Team All state. Brown was the Center of the 1955 North Summit Football Team. Along with the 1955 team were Wayne Wright and Roy Richins. Brown holds a bachelor's degree in education from Utah State University and did graduate work in educational psychology at the University of Utah. He lists his profession as farmer and consultant. He currently lives in Coalville, Utah and is the father of four children.

Political career
Brown was first elected to the State House in 1986 and served through 2000.  He was then re-elected in 2006. From 1993 to 1994 he was the House Assistant Majority Whip and from 1995 to 1998 he was the Speaker of the House.
 2012 Brown defeated John Zimmerman in the Republican convention and was then unchallenged in the general election on November 6, 2012.
 2014 Brown defeated Blaine Hone and John Zimmerman in the 2014 Republican convention. He then went on to win the general election on November 4, 2014, with 7,304 votes (67.5%) defeating democratic candidate Ray L. Worthen.
During the 2016 legislative session, Brown served on the Social Services Appropriations Subcommittee, the House Health and Human Services Committee, House Natural Resources, Agriculture, and Environment Committee and the Rural Development Legislative Liaison Committee.

2016 sponsored legislation

Brown also floor sponsored SB0109S01 School and Institutional Trust Lands Amendments, and SJR012 Proposal to Amend Utah Constitution -- Changes to School Funds.

Sources

1938 births
Utah State University alumni
University of Utah alumni
Members of the Utah House of Representatives
Living people
21st-century American politicians
People from Summit County, Utah
People from Coalville, Utah